= Latif Abad railway station =

Railway station in Pakistan

General information
- Owner: Ministry of Railways

Other information
- Station code: LFD

History
- Former names: Great Indian Peninsula Railway

Latif Abad railway station (Urdu: لطیف آباد ریلوے اسٹیشن) is a railway station located in Pakistan.

== See also ==
- List of railway stations in Pakistan
- Pakistan Railways
